Edvin Jensen (6 July 1900 – 19 November 1975) was a Danish wrestler. He competed in the Greco-Roman featherweight event at the 1920 Summer Olympics.

References

External links
 

1900 births
1975 deaths
Olympic wrestlers of Denmark
Wrestlers at the 1920 Summer Olympics
Danish male sport wrestlers
Sportspeople from Copenhagen